Junnar taluka is a taluka (subdivision) of the Pune district in the Indian state of Maharashtra. It is northernmost taluka of the District.The area is well known for two of the  Ashtavinayak temples at Lenyadri and Ozar respectively. The taluka is also the home of Shivneri Fort, GMRT (Khodad), and Vikram Sarabhai Earth Station at Arvi. There is also a tomb(Samadhi) at Ale of the buffalo that recited Vedas when requested by the 12th century Sant Dnyaneshwar. The five main dams are named Yedgaon, Pimapalgaon Joga, ManikDoha, Chilhewadi and Wadaj. An ancient place called Naneghat is there. It is known for historical evidence that was written in Bramhi Lipi, on the walls of the caves. Darya Ghat is 21  km from Junnar Which is famous for waterfalls.Kukdeshwar an ancient temple of lord Shiva is in Junnar.

Villages

See also
 Talukas in Pune district
 Junnar Tourism Official Website  Nisargramya Junnar Website
 Rupali Repale

References

Talukas in Pune district
Talukas in Maharashtra